Indiana State Road 237 in the U.S. state of Indiana is a discontinuous route in Perry and Crawford counties.

Route description

Southern section 

Northern section 
The Crawford County segment was created on November 21, 2007, when an  segment of SR 37 from Interstate 64 at Sulphur to SR 64 at English was renumbered as SR 237.  The redesignation is due to SR 37's designation being transferred to a new route (the Frank O'Bannon Highway) from I-64 to SR 64 and SR 145 between St. Croix and Eckerty.

Future 
In addition, a proposed highway by-pass of Paoli, the seat of Orange County, may carry the SR 237 designation as well.  This project is still in the planning stages and construction has yet to be scheduled.

Major intersections

References

"New highway marks milestone for association,"   Bedford Times-Mail, November 21, 2007

External links

237
Transportation in Perry County, Indiana
Transportation in Crawford County, Indiana